Zachary Parker is an American politician and member of the Council of the District of Columbia, representing Ward 5.

Early life and education
Parker was born in Chicago. He received a BS in Speech and Language Pathology from Northwestern University and a MA in Education Policy and Leadership from Columbia University.

Career
Parker worked as a math teacher with Teach for America and won his first election to the State Board of Education Ward 5 seat in 2018. In 2021, Parker served as president of the State Board of Education.

References

African-American people in Washington, D.C., politics
Living people
Washington, D.C., Democrats
Democratic Socialists of America politicians from Washington, D.C.
21st-century American politicians
Washington, D.C., government officials
Teach For America alumni
Year of birth missing (living people)